São Sebastião da Pedreira (English: Saint Sebastian of the Quarry) was a Portuguese parish (freguesia) in the municipality of Lisbon. With the 2012 Administrative Reform, the former São Sebastião da Pedreira parish merged with the Nossa Senhora de Fátima parish into a new parish named Avenidas Novas.

Main sites
Alfredo da Costa Hospital
Malhoa Museum
São Sebastião da Pedreira Church

References

 
Former parishes of Lisbon
2012 disestablishments in Portugal